Magic in the Water is a 1995 American family film directed by Rick Stevenson and starring Mark Harmon, Joshua Jackson and Sarah Wayne. It is about a fictional lake monster in British Columbia. The film was distributed by TriStar Pictures and produced by Triumph Films.

Plot
Ashley Black is depressed because her father Jack spends all his time focusing on his job instead of her and her older brother Joshua. She constantly records his radio show and listens to it. One day, her father takes them to a remote Canadian lake that was popular with tourists due to a myth about an aquatic monster named Orky. They rented a cabin next to an elderly First Nations man who uses a wheelchair. Jack meets a local psychiatrist, Dr. Wanda Bell, who is trying to aid some local men who claim that they have been possessed by Orky. When Ashley runs away, Jack also has the same experience while looking for her. As a result, he becomes more devoted to his children.

Ashley and Joshua find out that the reason that Orky is possessing people is to try and tell them that he is dying because a businessman is dumping toxic waste into the lake. Ashley and Joshua help the old man in the cabin next to theirs to find a totem pole in the woods. With the help of Hiro, the son of Japanese monster seekers, they expose the businessman's illegal dumping. Orky, however, still dies from the poisonous waste. The old man summons a lightning bolt which enters a hole in the cave where Orky lives. Ashley and Hiro stay on the dock overnight and leave some cookies out. When she realizes that the cookies have been eaten, Ashley screams with joy, which suggests that Orky is still alive, or reincarnated.

Cast
 Mark Harmon as Jack Black
 Joshua Jackson as Joshua Black
 Harley Jane Kozak as Wanda
 Sarah Wayne as Ashley Black
 Willie Nark-Orn as Hiro
 Adrien Dorval as Wright Hardy
 Mark Acheson as Lefty Hardy
 Anthony Towe as Taka
 John Procaccino as Frank
 Tom Cavanagh as Simon

Reception
Magic in the Water received generally negative from critics. On Rotten Tomatoes, it has an approval rating of 21% based on 24 reviews.

Critic Leonard Maltin wrote in his book that "All the magic must be in the water; there's certainly none on the screen.  Routine family film feels like recycled Spielberg."  Roger Ebert criticized the film's special effects, describing the creature Orky as an "ashen Barney". He also notes that Orky barely appears in the film at all.

At the 16th Genie Awards, the film won for cinematography and sound.

See also
 Loch Ness (1996)
 Mee-Shee: The Water Giant (2005)
 The Water Horse: Legend of the Deep (2007)

References

External links
 
 

1995 films
American children's drama films
TriStar Pictures films
Triumph Films films
Canadian drama films
English-language Canadian films
Canadian children's films
1995 directorial debut films
1990s American films
1990s Canadian films